The 2001 New York Mets season was the 40th regular season for the Mets. The 2001 Mets entered the season as defending National League champions, aiming to win the National League East from the Braves and  return to a second consecutive World Series and win it. They went 82-80 and finished 3rd in the NL East. They were managed by Bobby Valentine. They played home games at Shea Stadium.

Offseason
December 6, 2000: Turk Wendell was signed as a free agent with the New York Mets.
December 11, 2000: Tsuyoshi Shinjo was purchased by the New York Mets from the Hanshin Tigers (Japan Central).
January 5, 2001: Jorge Velandia was signed as a free agent with the New York Mets.

Regular season
The Mets played the first game in New York after the attacks on the World Trade Center on September 11. The game was played on September 21 and it was a 3-2 victory over the Atlanta Braves, thanks to a go-ahead two-run home run from Mike Piazza in the eighth inning.

Opening Day starters
Edgardo Alfonzo
Kevin Appier
Darryl Hamilton
Rey Ordóñez
Jay Payton
Mike Piazza
Tsuyoshi Shinjo
Robin Ventura
Todd Zeile

Season standings

Record vs. opponents

Notable transactions
May 9, 2001: Doug Linton was signed as a free agent with the New York Mets.
June 5, 2001: David Wright was drafted by the New York Mets in the 1st round (38th pick) of the 2001 amateur draft. Player signed July 12, 2001.
July 23, 2001: Todd Pratt was traded by the New York Mets to the Philadelphia Phillies for Gary Bennett.
July 25, 2001: Doug Linton was purchased by the LG Twins of Korea from the New York Mets.
July 27, 2001: Turk Wendell was traded by the New York Mets with Dennis Cook to the Philadelphia Phillies for Bruce Chen and Adam Walker (minors).
July 30, 2001: Rick Reed was traded by the New York Mets to the Minnesota Twins for Matt Lawton.

Game log 

|- bgcolor="#cfc"
| 1 || April 3 || @ Braves || 6–4  || Cook (1–0) || Lightenberg (0–1) || Benitez (1) || Turner Field || 42,117 || 1–0
|- bgcolor="#fcc"
| 2 || April 4 || @ Braves || 2–3 || Rocker (1–0) || Wall (0–1) || — || Turner Field || 27,924 || 1–1
|- bgcolor="#cfc"
| 3 || April 5 || @ Braves || 7–1 || Reed (1–0) || Perez (0–1) || — || Turner Field || 34,219 || 2–1
|- bgcolor="#fcc"
| 4 || April 6 || @ Expos || 6–10 || Thurman (1–0) || Rose (0–1) || — || Olympic Stadium || 45,183 || 2–2
|- bgcolor="#fcc"
| 5 || April 7 || @ Expos || 0–10 || Vazquez (1–0) || Trachsel (0–1) || || Olympic Stadium || 15,317 || 2–3
|- bgcolor="#fcc"
| 6 || April 8 || @ Expos || 2–5 || Peters (1–0) || Leiter (0–1) || Urbina (3) || Olympic Stadium || 11,321 || 2–4
|- bgcolor="#cfc"
| 7 || April 9 || Braves || 9–4 || Appier (1–0) || Millwood (0–1) || — || Shea Stadium || 53,640 || 3–4
|- bgcolor="#fcc"
| 8 || April 11 || Braves || 0–2 || Maddux (2–0) || Reed (1–1) || Rocker (2) || Shea Stadium || 36,048 || 3–5
|- bgcolor="#cfc"
| 9 || April 12 || Braves || 1–0  || Benitez (1–0) || Lightenberg (0–2) || — || Shea Stadium || 27,694 || 4–5
|- bgcolor="#fcc"
| 10 || April 13 || Reds || 2–3 || Fernandez (2–1) || Trachsel (0–2) || Graves (2) || Shea Stadium || 38,243 || 4–6
|- bgcolor="#fcc"
| 11 || April 14 || Reds || 0–1 || Reitsma (2–0) || Leiter (0–2) || Graves (3) || Shea Stadium || 55,067 || 4–7
|- bgcolor="#fcc"
| 12 || April 15 || Reds || 1–3 || Brower (1–0) || Appier (1–1) || Graves (4) || Shea Stadium || 39,643 || 4–8
|- bgcolor="#cfc"
| 13 || April 16 || Expos || 4–3 || Reed (2–1) || Thurman (1–2) || Benitez (2) || Shea Stadium || 18,241 || 5–8
|- bgcolor="#cfc"
| 14 || April 17 || Expos || 4–0 || Rusch (1–0) || Peters (1–1) || — || Shea Stadium || 20,177 || 6–8
|- bgcolor="#fcc"
| 15 || April 18 || Expos || 1–7 || Vazquez (2–1) || Trachsel (0–3) || — || Shea Stadium || 20,721 || 6–9
|- bgcolor="#fcc"
| 16 || April 20 || @ Reds || 5–9 || Fernandez (3–1) || Leiter (0–3) || Brower (1) || Cinergy Field || 26,557 || 6–10
|- bgcolor="#cfc"
| 17 || April 21 || @ Reds || 5–2 || Appier (2–1) || Reitsma (2–1) || Benitez (3) || Cinergy Field || 28,135 || 7–10
|- bgcolor="#cfc"
| 18 || April 22 || @ Reds || 5–1 || Reed (3–1) || Dessens (1–1) || — || Cinergy Field || 30,682 || 8–10
|- bgcolor="#fcc"
| 19 || April 24 || @ Brewers || 4–6 || DeJean (2–0) || Wall (0–2) || Leskanic (2) || Miller Park || 27,404 || 8–11
|- bgcolor="#fcc"
| 20 || April 25 || @ Brewers || 2–7 || Haynes (2–2) || Trachsel (0–4) || Weathers (3) || Miller Park || 30,353 || 8–12
|- bgcolor="#fcc"
| 21 || April 26 || @ Brewers || 8–12 || Fox (1–0) || Hinchliffe (0–1) || — || Miller Park || 25,233 || 8–13
|- bgcolor="#fcc"
| 22 || April 27 || @ Cardinals || 0–9 || Morris (3–2) || Appier (2–2) || — || Busch Stadium || 40,674 || 8–14
|- bgcolor="#cfc"
| 23 || April 28 || @ Cardinals || 6–5  || Benitez (2–0) || James (1–2) || — || Busch Stadium || 43,843 || 9–14
|- bgcolor="#fcc"
| 24 || April 29 || @ Cardinals || 1–12 || Kile (4–2) || Rusch (1–1) || — || Busch Stadium || 38,401 || 9–15
|- bgcolor="#cfc"
| 25 || April 30 || Astros || 8–2 || Trachsel (1–4) || Elarton (3–3) || — || Shea Stadium || 19,083 || 10–15
|-

|- bgcolor="#cfc"
| 26 || May 1 || Astros || 7–5 || Martin (1–0) || Cruz (0–1) || Benitez (4) || Shea Stadium || 25,619 || 11–15
|- bgcolor="#fcc"
| 27 || May 2 || Astros || 5–6  || Wagner (1–1) || Benitez (2–1) || — || Shea Stadium || 23,262 || 11–16
|- bgcolor="#cfc"
| 28 || May 4 || Diamondbacks || 4–2 || Reed (4–1) || Batista (0–1) || Franco (1) || Shea Stadium || 36,945 || 12–16
|- bgcolor="#cfc"
| 29 || May 5 || Diamondbacks || 8–1 || Rusch (2–1) || Ellis (3–1) || — || Shea Stadium || 35,630 || 13–16
|- bgcolor="#fcc"
| 30 || May 6 || Diamondbacks || 2–8 || Schilling (5–0) || Trachsel (1–5) || — || Shea Stadium || 37,673 || 13–17
|- bgcolor="#cfc"
| 31 || May 7 || @ Rockies || 10–9 || Gonzalez (1–0) || Bohanon (1–4) || — || Coors Field || 34,644 || 14–17
|- bgcolor="#fcc"
| 32 || May 8 || @ Rockies || 4–12 || Astacio (4–2) || Appier (2–3) || — || Coors Field || 36,602 || 14–18
|- bgcolor="#fcc"
| 33 || May 9 || @ Rockies || 0–6 || Hampton (5–0) || Reed (4–2) || — || Coors Field || 35,952 || 14–19
|- bgcolor="#fcc"
| 34 || May 10 || @ Rockies || 2–8 || Chacon (1–1) || Rusch (2–2) || — || Coors Field || 40,603 || 14–20
|- bgcolor="#fcc"
| 35 || May 11 || @ Giants || 2–3  || Nen (2–0) || Wall (0–3) || — || Pacific Bell Park || 41,059 || 14–21
|- bgcolor="#fcc"
| 36 || May 12 || @ Giants || 3–10 || Ortiz (6–1) || Gonzalez (1–1) || — || Pacific Bell Park || 41,059 || 14–22
|- bgcolor="#fcc"
| 37 || May 13 || @ Giants || 3–6 || Zerbe (1–0) || Appier (2–4) || — || Pacific Bell Park || 41,059 || 14–23
|- bgcolor="#cfc"
| 38 || May 15 || Padres || 1–0 || Reed (5–2) || Jones (1–5) || Benitez (5) || Shea Stadium || 21,490 || 15–23
|- bgcolor="#fcc"
| 39 || May 16 || Padres || 2–5 || Eaton (5–2) || Rusch (2–3) || Hoffman (6) || Shea Stadium || 20,134 || 15–24
|- bgcolor="#fcc"
| 40 || May 17 || Padres || 3–15 || Williams (4–3) || Trachsel (1–6) || — || Shea Stadium || 18,476 || 15–25
|- bgcolor="#cfc"
| 41 || May 18 || Dodgers || 8–0 || Leiter (1–3) || Brown (5–2) || Wendell (1) || Shea Stadium || 37,502 || 16–25
|- bgcolor="#fcc"
| 42 || May 19 || Dodgers || 2–10 || Prokopec (5–1) || Appier (2–5) || — || Shea Stadium || 46,346 || 16–26
|- bgcolor="#cfc"
| 43 || May 20 || Dodgers || 6–5 || Benitez (3–1) || Adams (2–2) || — || Shea Stadium || 43,404 || 17–26
|- bgcolor="#cfc"
| 44 || May 21 || @ Expos || 6–3 || Rusch (3–3) || Reames (2–6) || Benitez (6) || Olympic Stadium || 5,449 || 18–26
|- bgcolor="#fcc"
| 45 || May 22 || @ Expos || 0–3 || Armas (4–5) || Gonzalez (1–2) || Urbina (7) || Olympic Stadium || 4,186 || 18–27
|- bgcolor="#cfc"
| 46 || May 23 || @ Expos || 4–2 || Leiter (2–3) || Peters (2–4) || Benitez (7) || Olympic Stadium || 5,292 || 19–27
|- bgcolor="#cfc"
| 47 || May 24 || Marlins || 11–3 || Appier (3–5) || Burnett (2–2) || — || Shea Stadium || 22,877 || 20–27
|- bgcolor="#cfc"
| 48 || May 25 || Marlins || 4–3  || Franco (1–0) || Miceli (0–3) || — || Shea Stadium || 40,456 || 21–27
|- bgcolor="#fcc"
| 49 || May 26 || Marlins || 3–7 || Dempster (4–6) || Rusch (3–4) || — || Shea Stadium || 29,839 || 21–28
|- bgcolor="#cfc"
| 50 || May 27 || Marlins || 5–4 || Wendell (1–0) || Miceli (0–4) || Benitez (8) || Shea Stadium || 41,991 || 22–28
|- bgcolor="#fcc"
| 51 || May 28 || Phillies || 3–5  || Mesa (1–0) || Benitez (3–2) || Cormier (1) || Shea Stadium || 33,791 || 22–29
|- bgcolor="#fcc"
| 52 || May 29 || Phillies || 3–7 || Gomes (4–1) || Cook (1–1) || — || Shea Stadium || 26,579 || 22–30
|- bgcolor="#fcc"
| 53 || May 30 || Phillies || 3–6 || Padilla (2–1) || Franco (1–1) || Mesa (15) || Shea Stadium || 24,077 || 22–31
|- bgcolor="#fcc"
| 54 || May 31 || @ Marlins || 3–5 || Dempster (5–6) || Wendell (1–1) || Alfonseca (11) || Pro Player Stadium || 13,295 || 22–32
|-

|- bgcolor="#cfc"
| 55 || June 1 || @ Marlins || 11–5 || Gonzalez (2–2) || Clement (2–5) || — || Pro Player Stadium || 23,252 || 23–32
|- bgcolor="#cfc"
| 56 || June 2 || @ Marlins || 7–1 || Leiter (3–3) || Smith (3–1) || — || Pro Player Stadium || 33,061 || 24–32
|- bgcolor="#fcc"
| 57 || June 3 || @ Marlins || 0–1 || Alfonseca (3–2) || Wendell (1–2) || — || Pro Player Stadium || 22,483 || 24–33
|- bgcolor="#cfc"
| 58 || June 5 || @ Phillies || 9–0 || R. Reed (6–2) || Person (4–5) || — || Veterans Stadium || 22,060 || 25–33
|- bgcolor="#fcc"
| 59 || June 6 || @ Phillies || 1–6 || Telemaco (5–1) || Rusch (3–5) || — || Veterans Stadium || 32,703 || 25–34
|- bgcolor="#cfc"
| 60 || June 7 || @ Phillies || 6–5 || Franco (2–1) || Mesa (1–1) || Benitez (9) || Veterans Stadium || 20,636 || 26–34
|- bgcolor="#fcc"
| 61 || June 8 || @ Devil Rays || 5–7 || Rupe (3–5) || Trachsel (1–7) || Yan (6) || Tropicana Field || 15,547 || 26–35
|- bgcolor="#fcc"
| 62 || June 9 || @ Devil Rays || 2–5 || Sturtze (3–5) || Leiter (3–4) || Phelps (2) || Tropicana Field || 19,235 || 26–36
|- bgcolor="#cfc"
| 63 || June 10 || @ Devil Rays || 10–0 || Appier (4–5) || Lopez (3–8) || — || Tropicana Field || 19,994 || 27–36
|- bgcolor="#cfc"
| 64 || June 12 || @ Orioles || 10–3 || R. Reed (7–2) || Mercedes (1–8) || White (1) || Oriole Park at Camden Yards || 34,812 || 28–36
|- bgcolor="#cfc"
| 65 || June 13 || @ Orioles || 7–6  || Franco (3–1) || Groom (1–2) || Benitez (10) || Oriole Park at Camden Yards || 34,881 || 29–36
|- bgcolor="#fcc"
| 66 || June 14 || @ Orioles || 2–5 || Towers (4–1) || Trachsel (1–8) || Groom (3) || Oriole Park at Camden Yards || 37,853 || 29–37
|- bgcolor="#fcc"
| 67 || June 15 || Yankees || 4–5 || Mendoza (4–2) || Leiter (3–5) || Rivera (20) || Shea Stadium || 54,110 || 29–38
|- bgcolor="#fcc"
| 68 || June 16 || Yankees || 1–2 || Mussina (6–7) || Appier (4–6) || Rivera (21) || Shea Stadium || 54,195 || 29–39
|- bgcolor="#cfc"
| 69 || June 17 || Yankees || 8–7 || Wendell (2–2) || Almanzar (0–1) || Benitez (11) || Shea Stadium || 54,399 || 30–39
|- bgcolor="#cfc"
| 70 || June 18 || Expos || 2–1 || Wendell (3–2) || Yoshii (2–4) || Benitez (12) || Shea Stadium || 32,569 || 31–39
|- bgcolor="#cfc"
| 71 || June 19 || Expos || 4–1 || White (1–0) || Mota (1–1) || Franco (2) || Shea Stadium || 27,578 || 32–39
|- bgcolor="#cfc"
| 72 || June 20 || Expos || 4–3 || Leiter (4–5) || Vazquez (5–9) || Benitez (13) || Shea Stadium || 28,617 || 33–39
|- bgcolor="#fcc"
| 73 || June 21 || Expos || 3–10 || Blank (2–2) || Appier (4–7) || — || Shea Stadium || 32,668 || 33–40
|- bgcolor="#fcc"
| 74 || June 22 || Braves || 1–10 || Perez (5–5) || R. Reed (7–3) || — || Shea Stadium || 40,129 || 33–41
|- bgcolor="#fcc"
| 75 || June 23 || Braves || 3–9  || S. Reed (2–1) || White (1–1) || — || Shea Stadium || 42,736 || 33–42
|- bgcolor="#fcc"
| 76 || June 24 || Braves || 4–8 || Marquis (2–1) || Trachsel (1–9) || — || Shea Stadium || 47,181 || 33–43
|- bgcolor="#fcc"
| 77 || June 25 || @ Cubs || 1–2 || Tavarez (6–4) || Leiter (4–6) || Gordon (12) || Wrigley Field || 40,229 || 33–44
|- bgcolor="#fcc"
| 78 || June 26 || @ Cubs || 2–4 || Lieber (9–4) || Appier (4–8) || Gordon (13) || Wrigley Field || 37,854 || 33–45
|- bgcolor="#cfc"
| 79 || June 27 || @ Cubs || 5–4 || White (2–1) || Farnsworth (0–3) || Benitez (14) || Wrigley Field || 39,404 || 34–45
|- bgcolor="#fcc"
| 80 || June 28 || @ Braves || 2–6  || S. Reed (3–1) || Benitez (3–3) || — || Turner Field || 40,055 || 34–46
|- bgcolor="#cfc"
| 81 || June 29 || @ Braves || 3–1 || Trachsel (2–9) || Marquis (2–2) || Benitez (15) || Turner Field || 48,168 || 35–46
|- bgcolor="#fcc"
| 82 || June 30 || @ Braves || 2–5 || Maddux (9–5) || Leiter (4–7) || Karsay (2) || Turner Field || 49,568 || 35–47
|-

|- bgcolor="#cfc"
| 83 || July 1 || @ Braves || 2–1 || Appier (5–8) || Burkett (6–6) || Benitez (16) || Turner Field || 37,516 || 36–47
|- bgcolor="#fcc"
| 84 || July 3 || Cubs || 0–3 || Wood (8–5) || Reed (7–4) || Gordon (15) || Shea Stadium || 52,471 || 36–48
|- bgcolor="#cfc"
| 85 || July 4 || Cubs || 2–1 || Rusch (4–5) || Tapani (8–6) || Benitez (17) || Shea Stadium || 37,936 || 37–48
|- bgcolor="#fcc"
| 86 || July 5 || Cubs || 4–13 || Bere (6–4) || Trachsel (2–10) || — || Shea Stadium || 30,737 || 37–49
|- bgcolor="#fcc"
| 87 || July 6 || @ Yankees || 3–8 || Pettitte (9–4) || Leiter (4–8) || Mendoza (3) || Yankee Stadium || 55,534 || 37–50
|- bgcolor="#cfc"
| 88 || July 7 || @ Yankees || 3–0  || Franco (4–1) || Rivera (2–4) || Benitez (18) || Yankee Stadium || 55,589 || 38–50
|- bgcolor="#fcc"
| 89 || July 8 || @ Yankees || 1–4 || Mendoza (6–2) || Wendell (3–3) || Rivera (29) || Yankee Stadium || 55,528 || 38–51
|- bgcolor="#bbcaff"
| colspan=10 | 72nd All-Star Game in Seattle, Washington
|- bgcolor="#cfc"
| 90 || July 12 || Red Sox || 4–2 || Leiter (5–8) || Wakefield (6–3) || Benitez (19) || Shea Stadium || 37,698 || 39–51
|- bgcolor="#fcc"
| 91 || July 13 || Red Sox || 1–3 || Cone (5–1) || Appier (5–9) || Lowe (16) || Shea Stadium || 42,219 || 39–52
|- bgcolor="#cfc"
| 92 || July 14 || Red Sox || 2–0 || Rusch (5–5) || Arrojo (2–3) || Benitez (20) || Shea Stadium || 52,006 || 40–52
|- bgcolor="#cfc"
| 93 || July 15 || Blue Jays || 6–2 || Reed (8–4) || Michalak (6–7) || — || Shea Stadium || 32,138 || 41–52
|- bgcolor="#cfc"
| 94 || July 16 || Blue Jays || 3–0 || Trachsel (3–10) || Halladay (0–1) || Benitez (21) || Shea Stadium || 34,203 || 42–52
|- bgcolor="#cfc"
| 95 || July 17 || Blue Jays || 1–0 || Leiter (6–8) || Carpenter (7–6) || Benitez (22) || Shea Stadium || 26,630 || 43–52
|- bgcolor="#cfc"
| 96 || July 18 || Marlins || 4–3  || Wendell (4–3) || Nunez (2–3) || — || Shea Stadium || 24,545 || 44–52
|- bgcolor="#fcc"
| 97 || July 19 || Marlins || 3–8 || Dempster (11–8) || Rusch (5–6) || — || Shea Stadium || 33,129 || 44–53
|- bgcolor="#fcc"
| 98 || July 20 || @ Phillies || 1–10 || Person (8–5) || Reed (8–5) || — || Veterans Stadium || 22,886 || 44–54
|- bgcolor="#cfc"
| 99 || July 21 || @ Phillies || 6–3 || Trachsel (4–10) || Wolf (5–10) || Benitez (23) || Veterans Stadium || 33,181 || 45–54
|- bgcolor="#fcc"
| 100 || July 22 || @ Phillies || 2–3 || Santiago (3–4) || Franco (4–2) || Mesa (26) || Veterans Stadium || 30,812 || 45–55
|- bgcolor="#ccc"
| – || July 23 || @ Marlins || colspan=8|Postponed (rain); rescheduled for September 6
|- bgcolor="#fcc"
| 101 || July 24 || @ Marlins || 3–4 || Bones (3–3) || Appier (5–10) || Alfonseca (19) || Pro Player Stadium || 16,270 || 45–56
|- bgcolor="#cfc"
| 102 || July 25 || @ Marlins || 5–2 || Rusch (6–6) || Dempster (11–9) || Benitez (24) || Pro Player Stadium || 18,272 || 46–56
|- bgcolor="#fcc"
| 103 || July 26 || Phillies || 2–3 || Santiago (4–4) || Reed (8–6) || Mesa (27) || Shea Stadium || 38,468 || 46–57
|- bgcolor="#cfc"
| 104 || July 27 || Phillies || 6–1 || Trachsel (5–10) || Coggin (1–1) || — || Shea Stadium || 31,263 || 47–57
|- bgcolor="#cfc"
| 105 || July 28 || Phillies || 4–3 || Benitez (4–3) || Wendell (4–4) || — || Shea Stadium || 38,972 || 48–57
|- bgcolor="#cfc"
| 106 || July 29 || Phillies || 6–5 || Benitez (5–3) || Cormier (5–4) || — || Shea Stadium || 38,536 || 49–57
|- bgcolor="#fcc"
| 107 || July 31 || @ Astros || 2–3  || Cruz (2–1) || Riggan (0–1) || — || Enron Field || 33,006 || 49–58
|-

|- bgcolor="#cfc"
| 108 || August 1 || @ Astros || 8–2  || White (3–1) || Jackson (2–2) || — || Enron Field || 33,124 || 50–58
|- bgcolor="#fcc"
| 109 || August 2 || @ Astros || 3–4  || Williams (3–4) || Riggan (0–2) || — || Enron Field || 34,257 || 50–59
|- bgcolor="#fcc"
| 110 || August 3 || @ Diamondbacks || 0–7 || Johnson (14–5) || Leiter (6–9) || — || Bank One Ballpark || 43,806 || 50–60
|- bgcolor="#cfc"
| 111 || August 4 || @ Diamondbacks || 4–2 || Appier (6–10) || Batista (6–7) || Benitez (25) || Bank One Ballpark || 36,750 || 51–60
|- bgcolor="#fcc"
| 112 || August 5 || @ Diamondbacks || 1–2 || Schilling (16–5) || White (3–2) || Kim (9) || Bank One Ballpark || 36,870 || 51–61
|- bgcolor="#cfc"
| 113 || August 7 || Brewers || 3–0 || Chen (5–5) || Haynes (7–14) || Benitez (26) || Shea Stadium || 27,240 || 52–61
|- bgcolor="#cfc"
| 114 || August 8 || Brewers || 5–4 || Trachsel (6–10) || Levrault (5–7) || Benitez (27) || Shea Stadium || 34,619 || 53–61
|- bgcolor="#cfc"
| 115 || August 9 || Brewers || 4–3 || Leiter (7–9) || DeJean (3–2) || White (2) || Shea Stadium || 27,989 || 54–61
|- bgcolor="#fcc"
| 116 || August 10 || Cardinals || 6–7  || Veres (2–2) || White (3–3) || Karsay (7) || Shea Stadium || 32,844 || 54–62
|- bgcolor="#fcc"
| 117 || August 11 || Cardinals || 3–6 || Hermanson (10–9) || Rusch (6–7) || Veres (12) || Shea Stadium || 38,837 || 54–63
|- bgcolor="#fcc"
| 118 || August 12 || Cardinals || 1–4 || Kile (13–7) || Chen (5–6) || Veres (13) || Shea Stadium || 38,939 || 54–64
|- bgcolor="#fcc"
| 119 || August 14 || @ Padres || 0–6 || Herdon (1–1) || Trachsel (6–11) || — || Qualcomm Stadium || 24,803 || 54–65
|- bgcolor="#fcc"
| 120 || August 15 || @ Padres || 1–2 || Jarvis (10–9) || Leiter (7–10) || Hoffman (29) || Qualcomm Stadium || 20,838 || 54–66
|- bgcolor="#fcc"
| 121 || August 16 || @ Padres || 5–6 || Fikac (1–0) || White (3–4) || Hoffman (30) || Qualcomm Stadium || 22,614 || 54–67
|- bgcolor="#fcc"
| 122 || August 17 || @ Dodgers || 3–8 || Adams (9–5) || Rusch (6–8) || — || Dodger Stadium || 41,801 || 54–68
|- bgcolor="#cfc"
| 123 || August 18 || @ Dodgers || 5–4 || Riggan (1–2) || Trombley (3–6) || Benitez (28) || Dodger Stadium || 54,092 || 55–68
|- bgcolor="#cfc"
| 124 || August 19 || @ Dodgers || 6–5 || Trachsel (7–11) || Park (11–9) || Benitez (29) || Dodger Stadium || 49,395 || 56–68
|- bgcolor="#cfc"
| 125 || August 21 || Rockies || 5–2 || Leiter (8–10) || Hampton (12–10) || Benitez (30) || Shea Stadium || 28,510 || 57–68
|- bgcolor="#cfc"
| 126 || August 22 || Rockies || 2–1 || Appier (7–10) || Chacon (6–8) || Benitez (31) || Shea Stadium || 34,415 || 58–68
|- bgcolor="#fcc"
| 127 || August 23 || Rockies || 0–10 || Jennings (1–0) || Rusch (6–9) || — || Shea Stadium || 27,430 || 58–69
|- bgcolor="#cfc"
| 128 || August 24 || Giants || 4–3 || Chen (6–6) || Rueter (12–9) || Benitez (32) || Shea Stadium || 35,973 || 59–69
|- bgcolor="#cfc"
| 129 || August 25 || Giants || 3–2  || Riggan (2–2) || Nen (3–3) || — || Shea Stadium || 48,298 || 60–69
|- bgcolor="#cfc"
| 130 || August 26 || Giants || 6–5 || Leiter (9–10) || Ortiz (14–7) || Benitez (33) || Shea Stadium || 36,061 || 61–69
|- bgcolor="#fcc"
| 131 || August 27 || Giants || 5–6 || Rodriguez (8–1) || White (3–5) || Nen (37) || Shea Stadium || 27,084 || 61–70
|- bgcolor="#fcc"
| 132 || August 28 || Phillies || 6–9  || Politte (1–2) || Wall (0–4) || Bottalico (3) || Shea Stadium || 21,745 || 61–71
|- bgcolor="#cfc"
| 133 || August 29 || Phillies || 7–5 || Chen (7–6) || Daal (12–5) || Benitez (34) || Shea Stadium || 24,144 || 62–71
|- bgcolor="#cfc"
| 134 || August 30 || Phillies || 6–2 || Trachsel (8–11) || Coggin (4–4) || — || Shea Stadium || 33,734 || 63–71
|- bgcolor="#cfc"
| 135 || August 31 || Marlins || 6–1 || Leiter (10–10) || Penny (7–8) || — || Shea Stadium || 23,020 || 64–71
|-

|- bgcolor="#cfc"
| 136 || September 1 || Marlins || 3–2  || Roberts (1–0) || Acevedo (0–3) || — || Shea Stadium || 39,486 || 65–71
|- bgcolor="#fcc"
| 137 || September 2 || Marlins || 1–5 || Dempster (15–11) || Rusch (6–10) || — || Shea Stadium || 32,702 || 65–72
|- bgcolor="#cfc"
| 138 || September 3 || @ Phillies || 10–7 || Nitkowski (1–3) || Mesa (1–3) || Benitez (35) || Veterans Stadium || 26,891 || 66–72
|- bgcolor="#cfc"
| 139 || September 4 || @ Phillies || 5–3 || Trachsel (9–11) || Daal (12–6) || Benitez (36) || Veterans Stadium || 14,020 || 67–72
|- bgcolor="#cfc"
| 140 || September 5 || @ Phillies || 7–4 || Leiter (11–10) || Coggin (4–5) || — || Veterans Stadium || 16,089 || 68–72
|- bgcolor="#cfc"
| 141 || September 6 || @ Marlins || 5–2 || Appier (8–10) || Penny (7–9) || Benitez (37) || Pro Player Stadium || 10,188 || 69–72
|- bgcolor="#cfc"
| 142 || September 7 || @ Marlins || 6–1 || Rusch (7–10) || Burnett (9–11) || — || Pro Player Stadium || 13,285 || 70–72
|- bgcolor="#cfc"
| 143 || September 8 || @ Marlins || 9–7 || Franco (5–2) || Alfonseca (3–4) || Benitez (38) || Pro Player Stadium || 20,217 || 71–72
|- bgcolor="#fcc"
| 144 || September 9 || @ Marlins || 2–4 || Acevedo (1–3) || Trachsel (9–12) || Alfonseca (25) || Pro Player Stadium || 14,821 || 71–73
|- bgcolor="#ccc"
| – || September 11 || @ Pirates || colspan=8|Postponed (9/11 attacks); rescheduled for October 1 in New York
|- bgcolor="#ccc"
| – || September 12 || @ Pirates || colspan=8|Postponed (9/11 attacks); rescheduled for October 2 in New York
|- bgcolor="#ccc"
| – || September 13 || @ Pirates || colspan=8|Postponed (9/11 attacks); rescheduled for October 3 in New York
|- bgcolor="#ccc"
| – || September 14 || Expos || colspan=8|Postponed (9/11 attacks); rescheduled for October 5
|- bgcolor="#ccc"
| – || September 15 || Expos || colspan=8|Postponed (9/11 attacks); rescheduled for October 6
|- bgcolor="#ccc"
| – || September 16 || Expos || colspan=8|Postponed (9/11 attacks); rescheduled for October 7
|- bgcolor="#cfc"
| 145 || September 17 || @ Pirates || 4–1 || Franco (6–2) || Fetters (3–2) || Benitez (39) || PNC Park || 25,902 || 72–73
|- bgcolor="#cfc"
| 146 || September 18 || @ Pirates || 7–5 || Riggan (3–2) || Olivares (6–8) || Benitez (40) || PNC Park || 19,285 || 73–73
|- bgcolor="#cfc"
| 147 || September 19 || @ Pirates || 9–2 || Gonzalez (3–2) || McKnight (3–4) || — || PNC Park || 20,371 || 74–73
|- bgcolor="#cfc"
| 148 || September 21 || Braves || 3–2 || Benitez (6–3) || Karsay (3–5) || — || Shea Stadium || 41,235 || 75–73
|- bgcolor="#cfc"
| 149 || September 22 || Braves || 7–3 || Trachsel (10–12) || Perez (6–8) || Benitez (41) || Shea Stadium || 41,230 || 76–73
|- bgcolor="#fcc"
| 150 || September 23 || Braves || 4–5  || Smoltz (3–3) || Riggan (3–3) || — || Shea Stadium || 41,168 || 76–74
|- bgcolor="#cfc"
| 151 || September 25 || @ Expos || 2–0 || Appier (9–10) || Pavano (1–5) || — || Olympic Stadium || 4,166 || 77–74
|- bgcolor="#cfc"
| 152 || September 26 || @ Expos || 5–2 || Rusch (8–10) || Armas (9–13) || Benitez (42) || Olympic Stadium || 5,314 || 78–74
|- bgcolor="#cfc"
| 153 || September 27 || @ Expos || 12–6 || White (4–5) || Strickland (2–6) || — || Olympic Stadium || 6,968 || 79–74
|- bgcolor="#fcc"
| 154 || September 28 || @ Braves || 3–5 || Glavine (15–7) || Trachsel (10–13) || Smoltz (10) || Turner Field || 43,664 || 79–75
|- bgcolor="#fcc"
| 155 || September 29 || @ Braves || 5–8 || Perez (7–8) || Benitez (6–4) || — || Turner Field || 46,180 || 79–76
|- bgcolor="#cfc"
| 156 || September 30 || @ Braves || 9–6 || Appier (10–10) || Millwood (6–7) || Benitez (43) || Turner Field || 42,667 || 80–76
|-

|- bgcolor="#fcc"
| 157 || October 1 || Pirates || 1–5 || Anderson (9–17) || Rusch (8–11) || Sauerbeck (2) || Shea Stadium || 6,315 || 80–77
|- bgcolor="#fcc"
| 158 || October 2 || Pirates || 1–10 || Arroyo (5–7) || Chen (7–7) || — || Shea Stadium || 8,058 || 80–78
|- bgcolor="#cfc"
| 159 || October 3 || Pirates || 3–0 || Trachsel (11–13) || Richie (11–15) || — || Shea Stadium || 6,627 || 81–78
|- bgcolor="#fcc"
| 160 || October 5 || Expos || 6–8 || Thurman (9–11) || Leiter (11–11) || Strickland (9) || Shea Stadium || 10,281 || 81–79
|- bgcolor="#cfc"
| 161 || October 6 || Expos || 4–0 || Appier (11–10) || Pavano (1–6) || — || Shea Stadium || 15,025 || 82–79
|- bgcolor="#fcc"
| 162 || October 7 || Expos || 0–5 || Reames (4–8) || Rusch (8–12) || — || Shea Stadium' || 15,540 || 82–80
|-

Roster

Player stats

Batting

Starters by positionNote: Pos = Position;G = Games played; AB = At bats; H = Hits; Avg. = Batting average; HR = Home runs; RBI = Runs batted inOther battersNote: G = Games played; AB = At bats; H = Hits; Avg. = Batting average; HR = Home runs; RBI = Runs batted inPitching

Starting pitchersNote: G = Games pitched; IP = Innings pitched; W = Wins; L = Losses; ERA = Earned run average; SO = StrikeoutsOther pitchersNote: G = Games pitched; IP = Innings pitched; W = Wins; L = Losses; ERA = Earned run average; SO = StrikeoutsRelief pitchersNote: G = Games pitched; W = Wins; L = Losses; SV = Saves; ERA = Earned run average; SO = Strikeouts''

Awards and honors
 John Franco, Lou Gehrig Award

Farm system

LEAGUE CO-CHAMPIONS: Brooklyn

References

External links

2001 New York Mets at Baseball Reference
2001 New York Mets team page at www.baseball-almanac.com

New York Mets seasons
New York Mets
New York Mets
2000s in Queens